Édson Ricardo Nunes Correia Silva (born 2 March 1984 in Lisbon), known simply as Édson, is a Guinea-Bissauan professional footballer who plays for Portuguese club Associação Desportiva de Castro Daire as a right back.

References

External links
 
 
 
 
 

1984 births
Living people
Footballers from Lisbon
Portuguese footballers
Bissau-Guinean footballers
Association football defenders
Liga Portugal 2 players
Segunda Divisão players
S.C. Campomaiorense players
Moreirense F.C. players
S.C. Beira-Mar players
C.D. Santa Clara players
C.D. Tondela players
S.C. Freamunde players
AD Oliveirense players
Clube Oriental de Lisboa players
F.C. Tirsense players
Guinea-Bissau international footballers